The ninth season of the Russian reality talent show The Voice premiered on October 9, 2020 on Channel One. Dmitry Nagiev returned as the show's presenter. On August 17, 2020, Channel One announced that Basta, Polina Gagarina, Sergey Shnurov, and Valeriy Syutkin became the coaches.

Yana Gabbasova was announced the winner on December 30, 2020, marking Polina Gagarina's first win as a coach after four attempts and the first female coach to win in the show's history. At age 17, Gabbasova became the youngest winner in the show's history surpassing Darya Antonyuk at 20. Also, Yana became the 5th winner in the show’s history to have been just a one-chair turn in the blind auditions.

Coaches and presenter

On August 17, 2020, Channel One announced that Polina Gagarina, Sergey Shnurov and Valeriy Syutkin will be rejoined as the coaches by Basta who returned after a one-season break and replaced Konstantin Meladze.

Dmitry Nagiyev will return for his 9th season as the presenter.

Teams
Colour key

Blind auditions
The feature The Best coach of the season (in each episode) was applied again this season.
Colour key

The coaches performed "В "Голосе" – все!" at the start of the show.

The Battles 
The Battle Rounds will be starting on November 20, 2020. No steal were available. Contestants who win their battle would advance to the Knockout rounds.
Colour key

The Knockouts
The Knockout Rounds started on December 4, 2020. Similar to the previous season, each coach pairs three artists into one knockout with only one contestant from the trio advances to the next round and also can steal one losing artist from another coach. The top 12 contestants moved on to the Quarterfinal.
Colour key

Live shows 
Colour key:

Week 1: Top 12 — Quarterfinal (December 18)
The Live Top 12 Quarterfinal comprised episode 11. The top twelve artists performed, with two artists from each team advancing based on the sum of the viewers' and coach's votes.

Week 2: Top 8 — Semifinal (December 25)
The top eight artists performed on December 25, 2020, with one artist from each team advancing to the Final based on the sum of the viewers' and coach's votes

Week 3: Final (December 30)

Best Coach
Colour key

Reception

Rating

Notes

References

2020 Russian television seasons
The Voice (Russian TV series)